Senga is an erstwhile 'dialect' of Tumbuka that is actually a distinct language, more closely related to Bemba than to Tumbuka (Christine Ahmed 1995).

References

 
Sabi languages
Languages of Zambia
Articles citing ISO change requests